James Singleton, known professionally as James Pants, is an American multi-instrumental recording artist. Although his music defies simple categorization, he is promoted as a purveyor of the "fresh beat," an early-1980s sound with influences from 1980s soul, electro boogie, early rap, new wave, and post-punk disco.

Early life 
Singleton's father is a Presbyterian minister and he has lived in Texas, Boston, and Spokane.

Singleton used to be in a rap group called Ballistix in Austin, Texas.

Singleton was discovered by DJ and Stones Throw Records head Peanut Butter Wolf, whom he approached while still in high school. When Peanut Butter Wolf did a gig in his hometown of Austin, Texas, Pants left his prom, with his date in tow, to meet him at the show.

Career 
Singleton interned at Stones Throw offices. After releasing several singles and compilations with Stones Throw, he released his debut album, Welcome, in 2008. At some point between 2008-2009, he was part of the Bastard recording sessions and produced "Let's Dance," an unmixed Tyler, The Creator track from his Dinosaur EP. The second James Pants LP, Seven Seals, was released in July 2009; his third, self-titled LP was released on May 3, 2011, and his fourth LP, Savage, was released on April 14, 2015.

Singleton currently resides in New York City and works as a software engineer for Bloomberg L.P. He is affiliated with the Red Bull Music Academy.

Discography

Albums
Welcome, CD, 2008 Stones Throw Records
Seven Seals, CD, 2009 Stones Throw Records
James Pants, CD, 2011 Stones Throw Records
Savage, CD, 2015 Stones Throw Records

EPs
James Pants Meets Egyptian Lover, 2009 Stones Throw Records (split 12 with Egyptian Lover) New Tropical'', 2010 Stones Throw Records

References

External links
 Stones Throw Records: James Pants
 James Pants Interview Fact Magazine
 James Pants Interview Red Bull Music Academy

American electronic musicians
American multi-instrumentalists
American boogie musicians
Stones Throw Records artists
Living people
American electro musicians
Year of birth missing (living people)